The HP ProBook  is a line of business-oriented laptop computers made by Hewlett-Packard (HP Inc.). HP marketed the ProBook series to business users; the list price was lower than that of HP's higher-end EliteBook series.

History

S-Series (discontinued in 2012) 
In April 2009, HP introduced the ProBook s-series (standard/essential) notebooks, which consisted of the Intel powered 4410s, 4510s, and 4710s (14", 15.6", and 17.3" screens, respectively) and the AMD powered 4415s and 4515s (14" and 15.6" screens, respectively). This was followed by the introduction of the 13.3" ProBook 4310s in June of the same year. 
The s-series was updated in 2010 with Intel Core i3, i5, and i7 processors, a brushed aluminum case, chiclet keyboard, and multi-touch ClickPad. Updates to the line in 2012 included a new exterior aluminum design.

4x1xs
 ProBook 4310s
 ProBook 4311s
 ProBook 4410s
 ProBook 4411s
 ProBook 4510s
 ProBook 4710s
 ProBook 4415s
 ProBook 4416s
 ProBook 4515s

4x2xs
 ProBook 4320s
 ProBook 4321s
 ProBook 4420s
 ProBook 4421s
 ProBook 4520s
 ProBook 4720s
 ProBook 4325s
 ProBook 4326s
 ProBook 4425s
 ProBook 4525s

4x3xs
 ProBook 4230s
 ProBook 4330s
 ProBook 4331s
 ProBook 4430s
 ProBook 4431s
 ProBook 4520s
 ProBook 4530s
 ProBook 4730s
 ProBook 4435s
 ProBook 4436s
 ProBook 4535s

4x4xs

 ProBook 4340s
 ProBook 4341s
 ProBook 4440s
 ProBook 4441s
 ProBook 4540s
 ProBook 4740s
 ProBook 4445s
 ProBook 4446s
 ProBook 4545s

B-Series (discontinued in 2012) 

The ProBook B-series was announced on October 13, 2009, replacing the previous HP Compaq B-series with similar design in early models. All models still have a CD drive bay, docking port, pointstick options, screen latches, draining holes, easy-replaceable battery with additional slice options, TPM chip, socketed CPU, WLAN options and 2 RAM slots.

Two AMD powered models were announced in 2009 — the 14" ProBook 6445b and the 15.6" Probook 6545b; Their Intel powered counterparts were announced three months later as the 14" ProBook 6440b and the 15.6" Probook 6540b.; and the next-year upgrade is an AMD-powered 6455b and 6555b, and Intel-based 6450b and 6550b. 
The B-series design was updated in 2011 with the Intel-powered 6460b and 6560b, and the AMD-powered 6465b and in 2012 with the Intel-powered 6470b and 6570b, and the AMD-powered 6475b. The updated sibling EliteBook line had an additional magnesium frame under screen top lid, the keyboard LED-backlight, the aluminum bottom-cover, the 17" workstation version and the additional security options.

6x4xb
 ProBook 6440b
 ProBook 6540b
 ProBook 6445b
 ProBook 6545b

6x5xb
 ProBook 6450b
 ProBook 6550b
 ProBook 6455b
 ProBook 6555b

6x6xb
 ProBook 6360b
 ProBook 6460b
 ProBook 6560b
 ProBook 6465b
 ProBook 6565b

6x7xb
 ProBook 6470b
 ProBook 6570b
 ProBook 6475b

M-Series (discontinued in 2011)

HP launched the 5310m in September 2009 as a line of compact mid-range 12" and 13" ProBooks without CD-drive bay. The 5310m was enclosed by an aluminum and magnesium case, weighed under four pounds, and was less than an inch thick.  
The M-series was updated in September 2010 with a 5320m, closely followed with the release of the 5330m in May 2011 which featured a dual-tone aluminum chassis and Beats Audio.

5x1xm
 ProBook 5310m

5x2xm
 ProBook 5220m
 ProBook 5320m

5x3xm
 ProBook 5330m

G-Series
HP launched the G0 series in 2013. The computers are enclosed in an aluminium and magnesium case. The G1 series succeeded in 2014.

The first digit is a class of laptop (4## — entry, 6## — mid-class models), second digit is a display size (#3# for 13.3", #4# for 14.1", #5# for 15.6" and #7# for 17.3"). The third is an additional mark, like a ##5 for AMD-based model.

G0
 ProBook 440 G0
 ProBook 450 G0
 ProBook 470 G0

G1
This line has low-end siblings (15.6" HP 350 G1 and 14.1" HP 340 G1). The 4## models is entry line. and 6## is a mid-range models with aluminum and magnesium case.
 ProBook x360 11 G1 EE
 ProBook 430 G1
 ProBook 440 G1
 ProBook 450 G1
 ProBook 470 G1
 ProBook 445 G1
 ProBook 455 G1

 ProBook 640 G1
 ProBook 650 G1
 ProBook 645 G1
 ProBook 655 G1
 Pro x2 410 G1
 Pro x2 612 G1

G2
This line has similar siblings.
 ProBook x360 11 G2 EE
 ProBook 430 G2
 ProBook 440 G2
 ProBook 450 G2
 ProBook 470 G2
 ProBook 445 G2
 ProBook 455 G2
 ProBook 640 G2
 ProBook 650 G2
 ProBook 645 G2
 ProBook 655 G2
 Pro x2 410 G2
 Pro x2 612 G2

G3
 ProBook x360 11 G3 EE
 ProBook 430 G3
 ProBook 440 G3
 ProBook 446 G3
 ProBook 450 G3
 ProBook 470 G3
 ProBook 455 G3
 ProBook 640 G3
 ProBook 650 G3
 ProBook 645 G3
 ProBook 655 G3

G4
 ProBook x360 11 G4 EE
 ProBook 430 G4
 ProBook 440 G4
 ProBook 450 G4
 ProBook 470 G4
 ProBook 455 G4
 ProBook 640 G4
 ProBook 650 G4
 ProBook 645 G4
 ProBook 645 G4 Pakistan

G5
 ProBook x360 11 G5 EE
 ProBook 430 G5
 ProBook 440 G5
 ProBook x360 440 G1
 ProBook 450 G5
 ProBook 470 G5
 ProBook 455 G5
 ProBook 640 G5
 ProBook 650 G5

G6
 ProBook x360 11 G6 EE
 ProBook 430 G6
 ProBook 440 G6
 ProBook 450 G6
 ProBook 445 G6
 ProBook 445R G6
 ProBook 455R G6

G7
HP ProBook x360 435 G7 13.3-inch 2-in-1 was announced on January 16, 2020.
 ProBook 430 G7
 ProBook 440 G7
 ProBook 450 G7
 ProBook 445 G7
 ProBook 455 G7

G8
These are the ProBooks that have been released in Generation 8.
 ProBook 430 G8
 ProBook 440 G8
 ProBook 450 G8
 ProBook x360 435 G8
 ProBook 445 G8
 ProBook 455 G8
 ProBook 630 G8
 ProBook 640 G8
 ProBook 650 G8
 ProBook 635 Aero G8

Timeline of releases

See also

Competing laptop lines include:
 Acer TravelMate
 Dell Latitude and Vostro
 Lenovo ThinkPad and ThinkBook
 Fujitsu Lifebook

References

External links
 HP Official Site
 How to Screenshot on HP Laptop

 Hp Laptop

ProBook
Consumer electronics brands
Computer-related introductions in 2009